Robert Innes may refer to:

 Robert Innes (bishop) (born 1959), Anglican bishop and Bishop of the Diocese in Europe
 Robert Alexander Innes (1918–2005), Royal Air Force officer
 Robert T. A. Innes (1861–1933), Scottish-South African astronomer
 Bob Innes (New Zealand footballer), former association football player who represented New Zealand 
 Bob Innes (Scottish footballer) (1878–1959), Scottish association football player
 Sir Robert Innes, 1st Baronet (died c. 1655), see Innes baronets
 Sir Robert Innes, 2nd Baronet (c. 1690), see Innes baronets
 Sir Robert Innes, 1st Baronet (died c. 1650), see Innes baronets
 Sir Robert Innes, 3rd Baronet (died c. 1680), see Innes baronets
 Sir Robert Innes, 6th Baronet (c. 1703–1758), see Innes baronets